Odean Brown (born 8 February 1982) is a Jamaican cricketer. He made his first class debut on 12 February  2004 in the Carib Beer Cup tournament.

References

External links
 

1982 births
Living people
Jamaican cricketers
People from Westmoreland Parish
Jamaica cricketers
Jamaica Tallawahs cricketers